Manton is a census-designated place (CDP) partially in Tehama County, California, United States. It is also in Shasta County. The population in the Tehama County portion was 347 at the 2010 census, down from 372 at the 2000 census.

History
A post office called Manton has been in operation since 1889. According to tradition, the town derives its name from "Man's Town" because a large share of the first settlers were males.

In August 2005, the town was overrun by a forest fire which destroyed several homes and forced the evacuation of the entire town.  There were no injuries.

Geography
Manton is located at  (40.419020, -121.863519).

Climate
This region experiences very hot and dry summers, with average monthly temperatures in July, August and September over 70 °F.  According to the Köppen Climate Classification system, Manton has a warm-summer Mediterranean climate, abbreviated "Csb" on climate maps.

Demographics

2010
The 2010 United States Census reported that Manton had a population of 347. The population density was 19.6 people per square mile (7.6/km2). The racial makeup of Manton was 312 (89.9%) White, 0 (0.0%) African American, 20 (5.8%) Native American, 1 (0.3%) Asian, 0 (0.0%) Pacific Islander, 7 (2.0%) from other races, and 7 (2.0%) from two or more races.  Hispanic or Latino of any race were 35 persons (10.1%).

The Census reported that 331 people (95.4% of the population) lived in households, 16 (4.6%) lived in non-institutionalized group quarters, and 0 (0%) were institutionalized.

There were 146 households, out of which 29 (19.9%) had children under the age of 18 living in them, 90 (61.6%) were opposite-sex married couples living together, 8 (5.5%) had a female householder with no husband present, 6 (4.1%) had a male householder with no wife present.  There were 5 (3.4%) unmarried opposite-sex partnerships, and 0 (0%) same-sex married couples or partnerships. 37 households (25.3%) were made up of individuals, and 20 (13.7%) had someone living alone who was 65 years of age or older. The average household size was 2.27.  There were 104 families (71.2% of all households); the average family size was 2.67.

The population was spread out, with 51 people (14.7%) under the age of 18, 16 people (4.6%) aged 18 to 24, 52 people (15.0%) aged 25 to 44, 141 people (40.6%) aged 45 to 64, and 87 people (25.1%) who were 65 years of age or older.  The median age was 53.9 years. For every 100 females, there were 110.3 males.  For every 100 females age 18 and over, there were 120.9 males.

There were 180 housing units at an average density of 10.2 per square mile (3.9/km2), of which 123 (84.2%) were owner-occupied, and 23 (15.8%) were occupied by renters. The homeowner vacancy rate was 0%; the rental vacancy rate was 7.4%.  277 people (79.8% of the population) lived in owner-occupied housing units and 54 people (15.6%) lived in rental housing units.

2000
As of the census of 2000, there were 372 people, 159 households, and 114 families residing in the CDP.  The population density was 21.0 people per square mile (8.1/km2).  There were 205 housing units at an average density of 11.6 per square mile (4.5/km2).  The racial makeup of the CDP was 90.32% White, 0.27% African American, 1.34% Native American, 0.27% Asian, 1.34% Pacific Islander, 1.88% from other races, and 4.57% from two or more races. Hispanic or Latino of any race were 8.33% of the population.

There were 159 households, out of which 17.0% had children under the age of 18 living with them, 62.9% were married couples living together, 6.9% had a female householder with no husband present, and 28.3% were non-families. 21.4% of all households were made up of individuals, and 9.4% had someone living alone who was 65 years of age or older.  The average household size was 2.30 and the average family size was 2.64.

In the CDP, the population was spread out, with 18.0% under the age of 18, 3.5% from 18 to 24, 19.9% from 25 to 44, 37.1% from 45 to 64, and 21.5% who were 65 years of age or older.  The median age was 51 years. For every 100 females, there were 104.4 males.  For every 100 females age 18 and over, there were 113.3 males.

The median income for a household in the CDP was $28,333, and the median income for a family was $34,375. Males had a median income of $30,000 versus $21,094 for females. The per capita income for the CDP was $19,127.  About 9.4% of families and 18.1% of the population were below the poverty line, including 43.1% of those under age 18 and 8.2% of those age 65 or over.

Government

Utilities
The Volta powerhouses, currently owned by Pacific Gas and Electric Company, are located here.

Religion
Monastery of St. John of Shanghai & San Francisco is located in Manton, under the Orthodox Church in America Diocese of the West. It was founded in 1996 by then-Fr. Jonah (Paffhausen). There are currently 8 members of the community.

References

External links
 Monastery of St. John of San Francisco

Census-designated places in Tehama County, California
Census-designated places in California